"Apocalyptic" is a song by the American hard rock band Halestorm. It was released on January 12, 2015, as the lead single from the band's third studio album, Into the Wild Life.  The video for the song was released on January 28.

Track listing
All tracks are produced by Jay Joyce.

Charts

References

2015 songs
Halestorm songs
Songs written by Scott Stevens (singer)
Songs written by Lzzy Hale
Songs written by Nate Campany